Museo Nivola (Nivola Museum in English) in Orani, Sardinia, Italy is an institution devoted to the work of artist Costantino Nivola within the larger context of contemporary art, landscape and living traditions. 
The museum was established in 1994, a few years after the death of Nivola (1911-1988), a native of Orani, and has been expanding ever since. The old wash house was specially restored by architects Peter Chermayeff and Umberto Floris to house the museum, inaugurated in 1995.

The permanent collection boasts hundreds of sculptural and graphic pieces by Nivola, who played a unique role in 20th century modernism as an artist who worked closely with architects.

Aside from exhibiting Nivola's work, the museum produces temporary exhibitions on a regular basis. These center mainly on the relationship between art, architecture, and landscape, with a special focus on artists and movements that were close to Nivola, whose friends included Le Corbusier, Jackson Pollock, Saul Steinberg, Willem de Kooning, Alexander Calder and many other protagonists of mid-20th century art.

Orani sits at an altitude of 526 meters, at the foot of Mount Gonare, in the heart of the Barbagia region. Among the notable archaeological sites in the area are approximately 30 nuraghi and several “tombs of the giants”. The Sanctuary of Our Lady of Gonare at the crest of the mountain is of particular interest, as is the natural landscape on the road leading up to it. Orani excels in handicrafts. It is famous for its stonework, carpentry, and metalwork, and for tailors specializing in the use of traditional Sardinian velvet.

References

External links
 

Art museums and galleries in Italy
Museums established in 1994
Biographical museums in Italy
Museums in Sardinia
1994 establishments in Italy